Szwadron is a Polish historical film directed by Juliusz Machulski. It was released in 1993. The film was selected as the Polish entry for the Best Foreign Language Film at the 66th Academy Awards, but was not accepted as a nominee.

Plot
Period war drama. A highly fictionalised account on the exploits of the Russian Imperial Army Regiment of Dragoons of Novorossia and Don Cossacks during Polish January Uprising in 1863. A young Russian Count Fyodor Yeryiomin joins his regiment as a lieutenant in May 1863. He finds friends, enemies and love ... but, above all, he finds doubts.

Cast
 Aleksander Bednarz as Petersilge
 Grzegorz Damiecki
 Bernard-Pierre Donnadieu as Franek Bata
 Janusz Gajos as Dobrowolski
 Wojciech Klata as Symcha (as Wojtek Klata)
 Andrzej Konic as General
 Maciej Kozłowski as Kozlow
 Agnieszka Krukówna as Weronka
 Katarzyna Lochowska as Emilia

See also
 List of submissions to the 66th Academy Awards for Best Foreign Language Film
 List of Polish submissions for the Academy Award for Best Foreign Language Film

References

External links
 

1993 films
Polish historical films
1990s Polish-language films
Films directed by Juliusz Machulski
1990s historical films